Dichomeris ignorata is a moth in the family Gelechiidae. It was described by Edward Meyrick in 1921. It is found on Java in Indonesia.

The forewings are dark fuscous, slightly pale speckled, and the hindwings are grey.

References

Moths described in 1921
ignorata